Hylesia coinopus is a species of insect in the moth family Saturniidae. It is found in Central America and North America.

The MONA or Hodges number for Hylesia coinopus is 7750.

References

Further reading

 
 
 

Hemileucinae
Articles created by Qbugbot
Moths described in 1913